Katharine H. S. Moon is an American academic. Moon is Professor in the Department of Political Science at Wellesley College. She is also the inaugural holder of the SK-Korea Foundation Chair in Korea Studies and senior fellow at the Brookings Institution's Center for East Asia Policy Studies.

Moon was born in San Francisco, California and has a bachelor's degree from Smith College and a Ph.D. from Princeton University.

See also
Sex Among Allies

References

Year of birth missing (living people)
Living people
Smith College alumni
Princeton University alumni
Wellesley College faculty
American women political scientists
American political scientists
American women academics
21st-century American women
Brookings Institution people